Hold Everything may refer to:

Hold Everything!, a 1928 Broadway musical
Hold Everything (1930 film), a 1930 musical comedy film photographed on two-color Technicolor
Hold Everything (store), a defunct retail chain (1985–2006)
Hold Everything (TV series), a 1961 Australian television series